Dennis Callan (27 July 1932 — October 2006) was a Welsh professional footballer who played as a wing half.

Career
Born in Merthyr Tydfil, Callan began playing for local side Troedyrhiw before signing for Cardiff City in 1952. He made his debut for Cardiff during the 1955–56 season in a 2–1 defeat to Huddersfield Town. He also spent time on loan with Exeter City before returning to non-league football.

References

1932 births
2006 deaths
Welsh footballers
Sportspeople from Merthyr Tydfil
Troedyrhiw F.C. players
Cardiff City F.C. players
Exeter City F.C. players
English Football League players
Association football wing halves